Sperry is an unincorporated community in Adair County, in the U.S. state of Missouri.

History
A post office called Sperry was established in 1883, and remained in operation until 1907. The community's name is a transfer from Sperry, Michigan.

References

Unincorporated communities in Adair County, Missouri
Unincorporated communities in Missouri